An SS7 point code is similar to an IP address in an IP network.  It is a unique address for a node (Signaling Point, or SP), used in MTP layer 3 to identify the destination of a message signal unit (MSU).

In such a message you will find an OPC (Originating Point Code) and a DPC (Destination Point Code); sometimes documents also refer to it as a signaling point code.  Depending on the network, a point code can be 24 bits (North America, China), 16 bits (Japan), or 14 bits (ITU standard, International SS7 network and most countries) in length.

ANSI point codes use 24 bits, mostly in 8-8-8 format.
ITU point codes use 14 bits and are written in 3-8-3 format.

Fourteen bit point codes can be written in a number of formats. The most common formats are decimal number, hexadecimal number, or 3-8-3 format (3 most significant bits, 8 middle bits, 3 least significant bits).

Twenty-four bit point codes may be written in decimal, hexadecimal, or 8-8-8 format.

Abbreviations
OPC Originating Point Code
DPC Destination Point Code
ISPC International Signaling Point Code

References

External links
Web-based PointCode converter
SS7 Point Code Converter by Valid8.com

Signaling System 7